Aram Byer James is a former Santa Clara County, CA Assistant Public Defender, police watchdog, social activist, and civil rights attorney. As an expert on the defense of necessity, he headed the team of attorneys defending Stanford University students and professors arrested in anti-apartheid protests in 1980’s. He is an advocate of jury nullification, educator in the use of the Marsden Motion to fire ineffective public defenders, a critic of the prison industrial complex, and critic of police use of tasers and racial profiling.

References

People from Santa Clara County, California
Law in the San Francisco Bay Area
Living people
Activists from the San Francisco Bay Area
California lawyers
Year of birth missing (living people)
Place of birth missing (living people)
Jury nullification
Public defenders